Hendrik von Paepcke (born 15 December 1974) is a German equestrian. He competed in the individual eventing at the 1996 Summer Olympics.

References

External links
 

1974 births
Living people
German male equestrians
Olympic equestrians of Germany
Equestrians at the 1996 Summer Olympics